Henry Medley (1687 – 5 August 1747) was an officer of the Royal Navy, rising to the rank of vice-admiral.

Life

Medley entered the Royal Navy in 1703, and in 1706 was midshipman of the 80-gun  with Captain Price at the relief of Barcelona. In 1717 he was a lieutenant of the 90-gun , flagship of Sir George Byng in the Baltic Sea.

In 1722, while commanding the 50-gun  in the Mediterranean, he seized a ship named the Revolution, lying within the mole of Genoa, on information of her being in the service of the Old Pretender. He later commanded the Leopard on the coast of Portugal and in the English Channel until the end of 1728.

From 1731 to 1735 Medley was employed on the home station. At this period he was Governor of Newfoundland.

In 1741 Medley commanded the 70-gun  in the Channel Fleet under Sir John Norris, and in 1742–4 was with Norris as captain of the fleet. On 19 June 1744 he was promoted to be rear-admiral of the white, and in the following winter commanded a squadron cruising in the Channel Soundings for the protection of trade.

On 23 April 1745 Medley was promoted to be vice-admiral, and sent out as commander-in-chief of the Mediterranean Fleet. The service was one of blockade and co-operation with the allied armies in the War of the Austrian Succession, who in the winter of 1746–7 invaded Provence; but, after an unsuccessful attack on Antibes, they were obliged to retreat.

On 15 July 1747 Medley was advanced to be Vice-Admiral of the Red. He died, probably not knowing of the promotion, on board the 80-gun , at Vado Ligure, on 5 August 1747.

George Rodney served with him on two ships at the beginning of his career with Medley acting as a mentor to the younger man.

A monument in Medley's memory, attributed to William Tyler, was placed in York Minster.

Notes

a.  Some sources indicate that the governor in 1740 was Lord George Graham. There is no evidence to support this appointment.

Citations

External links
Biography at Government House The Governorship of Newfoundland and Labrador

Attribution

1687 births
1773 deaths
Governors of Newfoundland Colony
Royal Navy admirals
British military personnel of the War of the Spanish Succession
Royal Navy personnel of the War of the Austrian Succession